Process Image Exchange Protocol (PieP) is a very simple Fieldbus protocol used for process automation. It is an application layer protocol developed over TCP/IP. PieP uses method of transferring process images between I/O Devices and the PLC which makes the protocol simple to use. This protocol works just ensuring that the mirror of the input image in the PLC gets updated from the generated input image from I/O Device and the output image in the I/O device is always maintained as same as the mirror image in the PLC.

See also

Computer network
Computer science

External links
 PieP Open Source
 PieP Blog

Industrial Ethernet